Huzzah (sometimes written hazzah; originally spelled huzza and pronounced huz-ZAY, now often pronounced as huz-ZAH; in most modern varieties of English hurrah or hooray) is, according to the Oxford English Dictionary (OED), "apparently a mere exclamation".   The dictionary does not mention any specific derivation.  Whatever its origins, it has seen occasional literary use since at least the time of Shakespeare, as the first use was in 1573, according to Merriam-Webster.

Use
Huzzah may be categorised with such interjections as hoorah and hooray.  According to the Oxford English Dictionary, "In English, the form hurrah is literary and dignified; hooray is usual in popular acclamation".

In common usage, such as cheers at sporting events and competitions, the speaker need not make distinction, and the words are distinguished by regional dialect and accent.

Origin and military usage
The origin of the word in its various forms is not clear, but it may have been influenced by war cries from various languages: the Oxford English Dictionary (OED) suggests Norse, Dutch, Russian and Prussian words that may have played a part. 

Anthropologist Jack Weatherford hypothesized that it comes from the Mongolian Huree; used by Mongol armies, and spread throughout the world during the Mongol Empire of the 13th century. The word is a praise, much like amen or hallelujah, shouted at the end of speeches or prayers.

Contrary to popular belief, the word does not appear in Shakespeare's original works. Written in three parts around 1591, Shakespeare's I, II, and III Henry VI were condensed by Charles Kemble in 1888 into a single text titled, Henry VI. Though Kemble's condensed version records the last line of Act III, Scene III as, "All. Huzza ! huzza ! huzza !— Long live the King !", this line does not appear in Shakespeare's original text, but is rather Kemble's own insertion between II Henry VI, Act IV, Scenes VIII and IX.

Often incorrectly used at Renaissance Festivals and American Revolution reenactments, Huzzah was originally spelled Huzza and pronounced huz-ZAY. In the poetry and writings of the late 1700s, words like say, play, and day were used to rhyme with Huzza. One example can be seen in the song "Keppel Forever":

"Bonfires, bells did ring; Keppel was all the ding,
Music did play;
Windows with candles in, for all to honor him:
People aloud did sing, “Keppel! Huzza!”"

The OED notes that in the 17th and 18th centuries, it was identified as a sailor's cheer or salute, and suggests that it was possibly related to words like heeze and hissa, which are cognates of hoist.

In the 18th and early 19th centuries, three 'huzzahs' were given by British infantry before a bayonet charge, as a way of building morale and intimidating the enemy.  The book Redcoat: The British Soldier in the Age of Horse and Musket by military historian Richard Holmes indicates that this was given as two short 'huzzahs', followed by a third sustained one as the charge was carried out.

See also
 Hip hip hooray
 Hooah
 Hooyah
 Oorah

References

Interjections
English words
Battle cries